Heðin is a Faroese given name that may refer to

 Heðin Brú (1901–1987), pen name of Faroese novelist and translator Hans Jacob Jacobsen
 Heðin M. Klein (born 1950), Faroese teacher, writer and former politician
 Heðin á Lakjuni (born 1978), Faroese football player
 Heðin Mortensen (born 1946), Faroese politician

See also
 Hedin (surname)

Faroese masculine given names